Ekti Raat ( One Night) is a 1956 Indian Bengali-language comedy film directed by Chitta Basu and produced by Harendranath Chattopadhyay based on, Bhimpalashree, a story of Bengali novelist Balai Chand Mukhopadhyay. Film starring Uttam Kumar and Suchitra Sen in lead role with Tulsi Chakraborty and Bhanu Banerjee. This film was released on 26 April 1956 in the banner of H.N.C. Productions. In the 1990s, a television series Manush, based on the same plot, aired. This film become successful at the box office.

Plot
This film revolves around the miscommunication and misunderstanding of two couples and their family leading to comic situations. Sushavan Dutta and his wife, Anita, were invited at their relative Digbijay Babu's house. While on a journey Anita misses the train and Sushavan has to journey with another lady Santana. Santana is the wife of famous political leader Brojesh. At night they take shelter as husband and wife in Gosaiji's hotel, Harimatar Panthashala because Gosaiji allows married couples only. Santana carries a puppy with her, which runs away from the garden of the hotel and Sushovan has to chase it at night. When Anita's mother is angered upon learning that Sushavan is untraced.

Cast
 Uttam Kumar as Sushovan
 Suchitra Sen as Santana
 Tulsi Chakraborty as Gosaiji
 Bhanu Bannerjee as Chaku
 Anup Kumar as Fatka
 Shyam Laha
 Kamal Mitra as Brojeshwar
 Jahor Roy as Paresh
 Pahadi Sanyal as Digbijoy
 Chandrabati Devi
 Sabita Bose as Anita
 Molina Devi as Shampu, Anita's mother
 Jiben Bose as Sadananda Behari
 Gurudas Banerjee as Jitu
 Menaka Devi as Khyanto

Soundtrack

Reception
The film remembered as one of the best film of Uttam Suchitra pair. It's become hit at the box office and ran for 50 days in the theaters. When it's re released in 1970s it's again became successful.

Reworked
In 1990s a Bengali television series is made as name Manush which is based on the same plot and story.

References

External links
 

1956 films
Bengali-language Indian films
Films based on Indian novels
Indian romantic comedy-drama films
1950s Bengali-language films
Indian black-and-white films
Films based on works by Balai Chand Mukhopadhyay
1950s romantic comedy-drama films